A breve (less often , neuter form of the Latin  "short, brief") is the diacritic mark ˘, shaped like the bottom half of a circle. As used in Ancient Greek, it is also called , . In many forms of Latin, ˘ is used for a shorter, softer variant of a vowel, such as "Ĭ", where the sound is nearly identical to the English /i/. (See: Latin IPA)

Length 
The breve sign indicates a short vowel, as opposed to the macron ¯, which indicates long vowels, in academic transcription. It is often used that way in dictionaries and textbooks of Latin, Ancient Greek, Tuareg and other languages. However, there is a frequent convention of indicating only the long vowels. It is then understood that a vowel with no macron is short. If the vowel length is unknown, a breve as well as a macron are used in historical linguistics (Ā̆ ā̆ Ē̆ ē̆  Ī̆ ī̆ Ō̆ ō̆ Ū̆ ū̆ Ȳ̆ ȳ̆).

In Cyrillic script, a breve is used for Й. In Belarusian, it is used for both the Cyrillic Ў (semivowel U) and in the Latin (Łacinka) Ŭ. Ў was also used in Cyrillic Uzbek under the Soviet Union. The Moldovan Cyrillic alphabet uses a breve on Ӂ to represent a voiced postalveolar affricate  (corresponding to  before a front vowel in the Latin script for Moldovan). In Chuvash, a breve is used for Cyrillic letters Ӑ (A-breve) and Ӗ (E-breve). In Itelmen orthography, it is used for Ӑ, О̆ and Ў. The traditional Cyrillic breve differs in shape and is thicker on the edges of the curve and thinner in the middle, as opposed to the Latin one, but the Unicode encoding is the same.

In Emilian, ĕ ŏ are used to represent  in dialects where also long  occur.

In Esperanto, u with breve (ŭ) represents a non-syllabic u in diphthongs , analogous to Belarusian ў.

In the transcription of Sinhala, the breve over an m or an n indicates a prenasalized consonant; for example, n̆da is used to represent .

In the International Phonetic Alphabet, a breve over a phonetic symbol is used to indicate extra-shortness.

Other uses 
In other languages, it is used for other purposes.

 In Romanian, A with breve represents /ə/, as in măr (apple).
 G-breve appears in the Azerbaijani, Kazakh, Crimean Tatar, Tatar, and Turkish alphabets. In Turkish, ğ lengthens the preceding vowel. It is thus placed between two vowels and is silent in standard Turkish but may be pronounced  in some regional dialects or varieties closer to Ottoman Turkish.
 The breve, together with the circumflex and horn, are used in the Vietnamese language to represent additional vowels.
 The McCune-Reischauer romanization system of the Korean alphabet's script uses breves over o and u to represent the vowels ㅓ (ŏ) and ㅡ (ŭ).
 H-breve below Ḫ ḫ is used to transliterate the Arabic character Ḫāʾ in DIN 31635. It is also used to transliterate Akkadian, Hittite cuneiform, and Egyptian hieroglyphs.
On German language maps, a double breve is often used in abbreviated placenames that end in -b͝g., short for -burg, a common suffix originally meaning “castle”. This prevents misinterpretation as -berg, another common suffix in placenames (meaning “mountain”). Thus, for example, Freib͝g. stands for Freiburg, not Freiberg.
Certain transcription systems for certain varieties of Chinese employ the breve to represent one of the tones, including Foochow Romanized for the Fuzhou dialect of Eastern Min, and Kienning Colloquial Romanized for  the Jian'ou dialect of Northern Min (which also uses the caron).
 I-breve (Ĭ, ĭ) is used in the dialects of Crimean Tatar language spoken in Romania. It pronounce [ɪ]  sound like in Tatar tĭlĭ (Tatar language).
In Khmer, ă, ĕ, ĭ, ŏ, œ̆, and ŭ are used in Khmer romanization, e.g. siĕm reăp (Siem Reap).
 In the Syriac languages, ĕ is used to denote an "eh" or /ˈɛ/ sound.
 The ISO 259 Romanization of Hebrew uses ă, ḝ, and ŏ for reduced vowels.

Letters with breve

Encoding 
Unicode and HTML code (decimal numeric character reference) for breve characters.

In LaTeX the controls \u{o} and \breve{o} put a breve over the letter o.

See also 
 Caron
 Macron
 Inverted breve

Notes

External links 
Diacritics Project — All you need to design a font with correct accents

Greek-script diacritics
Poetic rhythm
Latin-script diacritics
Cyrillic-script diacritics